Van Orden is a surname. Notable people with the surname include:

Dick Van Orden (1921-2018), United States Navy admiral
Geoffrey Van Orden (born 1945), British politician
George O. Van Orden (1906–1967) United States Marine Corps official
Kate van Orden, American musicologist and bassoonist
Thomas Van Orden (1944–2010), American lawyer
John Smith (actor) (1931–1995), born Robert Errol Van Orden

See also
Forshee-Van Orden House, a house in New Jersey, United States
Shuart-Van Orden Stone House, a house in New York, United States
Van Orden v. Perry, a U.S. Supreme Court case

Surnames of Dutch origin